TVE HD was a Spanish high-definition test television channel owned and operated by Televisión Española (TVE), the television division of state-owned public broadcaster Radiotelevisión Española (RTVE). It was available via pay television platforms Digital+ and Movistar TV, but not on DTT nor free-to-air as originally planned.

It was launched on 6 August 2008 broadcasting the 2008 Olympic Games in high-definition. The channel was available until its closure on 31 December 2013 when TVE launched the high-definition versions of La 1 and Teledeporte.

External links
 TVE HD screenshots

High-definition television
Spanish-language television stations
Television channels and stations established in 2008
Television channels and stations disestablished in 2013
RTVE defunct channels